This is a list of college football coaches with 0 career wins. Inclusion on the list requires coaching at the college level for two or more seasons.

"College level" is defined as a four-year college program in either the National Association of Intercollegiate Athletics or the National Collegiate Athletic Association. If the team competed at a time before the official organization of either of the two groups but is generally accepted as a "college football program" it would also be included.

Leaders by category
Six coaches managed to lead teams to one tie game in their career and therefore have a "Win %" that is greater than zero. No coaches on the list managed more than one tie game.

Five coaches on the list held their post for 3 seasons and one for a total of four seasons. Five coaches managed 20 or more losses during their time as head coach.

Coach Rob Green of Missouri Southern managed to achieve the list by coaching the same school in two non-consecutive seasons (1997 and 2003). Four other coaches also achieved that feat, all before 1920.

Three programs have two coaches on the list: Coast Guard (coaches Marron and Kapral teamed up for 4 seasons and 22 losses); Hardin-Simmons (coaches Martin and McChesney for 4 seasons and 28 losses); and Prairie View A&M (coaches Beard and Sapenter combined for 6 seasons and 66 loses). Beard and Sapenter completed their losses in consecutive order, from 1991 through 1996 as a part of the longest losing streak in college football history.

Several coaches on the list (such as John R. Pinkett) coached for two seasons but a considerable low number of games. Six coaches managed only two losses. Four of those coached two single-game seasons, the remaining two also managed a tie game one of the two seasons.

College football coaches with 0 wins
This list may be incomplete.  You can help Wikipedia by editing it.

Table reference

See also
 List of college football coaches with 200 career wins
 List of college football coaches with 100 career losses
 List of college football coaches with 20 career ties
 List of college football coaches with 30 seasons
 List of college football coaches with a .750 winning percentage

References

0 career wins